Mahmoud Yavari (11 October 1939 – 10 November 2020) was an Iranian football coach and player. He was head coach of the Iran national football team for a short period of time in 1984. He had coached many teams like Zob Ahan, Sepahan, Shahin Bushehr, Tractor, Pas Tehran, Pas Hamedan, Rah Ahan and Fajr Sepasi. He was one of the oldest and most experienced head coaches in Iranian football history.

Playing career

Club
He began his football at Shahin Isfahan and joined the PAS after the club's establishment and was teammate with Ranjbar and Habibi. He retired and left Pas in 1969.

International
He was invited to the Iran national football team by Mahmoud Bayati in 1967. He made his debut in a match against Hong Kong on 10 May 1968. He had just three caps with the national team without scoring any goal.

Coaching career

Early years
After Zob Ahan was established in 1969, Yavari became the club's first ever head coach but because he didn't have any managerial experience, he was sacked in 1970. Then, he was appointed as coach to another Isfahan-based team, Sepahan. He was head coach of Sepahan for eight seasons in his first time in the club. He resigned in 1978 and was quickly appointed as Bargh Shiraz head coach but was sacked in the same year. Sepahan appointed Yavari for a second time and was kept as club head coach until 1980.

National team head coach
In 1980, he was selected as Iran national under-20 football team head coach. These were successful years for Yavari. After his good results with the under-20 team, he was appointed as coach for the Iran national Olympic team in 1982.

On 7 August 1984, he became head coach of Iran. Along with his assistant, Nasser Ebrahimi, they helped to build a new base for the national team. He led six matches, all of them won, but resigned on 1 December 1984. After his role in the senior team, he returned as the head coach of the under-20 team in 1985 and resigned in 1996.

Later career
He was Bargh Shiraz head coach in 1996. In 1998, he became Fajr Sepasi head coach but was sacked in 1999. After that, he returned to PAS Tehran as head coach in 1999 but only for a short period. After that, Yavari led many teams.

He was appointed as the head coach of Saba in the summer of 2010 and a few months later was sacked by the club. He was head coach of Steel Azin from April 2011 until May 2011. He was appointed as head coach of Fajr Sepasi on 27 November 2011. He led the club for two seasons and left the club at the end of 2012–13 season. In July 2013, he was named as head coach of Mes Kerman. He resigned as the manager of the club on 14 September 2013 to become head coach of Fajr Sepasi after just four months. After Fajr's relegation, Yavari resigned and retired.

Coaching career statistics

References

Iran National Team Coaches

External links

1939 births
2020 deaths
Iranian footballers
Iranian football managers
Pas players
Sepahan S.C. managers
Bargh Shiraz F.C. managers
Zob Ahan Esfahan F.C. managers
Iran national under-20 football team managers
Olympic football managers of Iran
Tractor S.C. managers
Saba Qom F.C. managers
Association football defenders
Esteghlal Ahvaz F.C. managers
Persian Gulf Pro League managers
Shahin Bushehr F.C. managers